Boulevard was a 1976 album by Canadian singer-songwriter Murray McLauchlan.

Track listing
All songs by Murray McLauchlan.
 "Harder to Get Along" – 5:10
 "Train Song" – 5:37
 "Met You at the Bottom" – 5:03
 "La Guerre, C'est Fini Pour Moi" – 5:16
 "On The Boulevard" – 3:51
 "As Lonely As You" – 3:28
 "Crying to Me" – 4:15
 "Slingback Shoes" – 3:47
 "Gypsy Boy" – 5:00

Personnel
Murray McLauchlan - vocals, guitar, piano, harmonica
The Silver Tractors
Gene Martynec - guitar
Dennis Pendrith - bass, harmony vocals
Ben Mink - mandolin, fiddle
Ronney Abramson - vocals on "Crying to Me" and "Slingback Shoes"
Technical
Ken Friesen - engineer
Bart Schoales - art direction, photography

References

1976 albums
Murray McLauchlan albums
True North Records albums